Iran–Romania relations are foreign, economic and cultural relations between Iran and Romania. Iran has an embassy in Bucharest. Romania has an embassy in Tehran.

History
The knight Keun of the Dutch legacy of Tehran was delegated to Persia on December 16, 1880 by the Government of Romania. In 1881 and 1887, Persia opened an honorary vice-consulate in Galați, respectively an honorary consulate in Brăila. In the year 1902, links were established at the level of links. These were interrupted between October 14, 1941 and July 27, 1946. On October 25, 1965, relations were established at the embassy level. Romania was among the first countries to look after and recognize the administration after the Iranian Revolution, and Iran between the first countries to care and the recognition of a new leadership after the 1989 revolution.

On 29 July 2021, the oil tanker MT Mercer Street was attacked on the Gulf of Oman, killing one Romanian citizen, the captain of the ship, and one British citizen. On 2 August, the Minister of Foreign Affairs of Romania Bogdan Aurescu said that it was clear after investigations that Iran had committed the attack and condemned the country for it. He furthermore stated that "there is no justification whatsoever for deliberately attacking civilians" and that "we continue to coordinate with our partners for an appropriate response". As a result of the attack, the Iranian ambassador to Romania was urgently summoned at the Romanian ministry of foreign affairs at Bucharest. The incident was also condemned by officials from Israel, the United Kingdom and the United States.

See also
 Foreign relations of Iran 
 Foreign relations of Romania

References

External links
Bilateral relations on the Ministry of Foreign Affairs of Romania (Romanian)

 

Iran–Romania relations
Romania
Iran